James S. Abrahams (born May 10, 1944) is an American film director and writer, best known as a member of Zucker, Abrahams and Zucker.

Life and career
Abrahams was born to a Jewish family in Shorewood, Wisconsin, the son of Louise M. (née Ogens), an educational researcher, and Norman S. Abrahams, a lawyer. He attended Shorewood High School. He has a home in Eagle River, Wisconsin where he has spent summers since he was a child.

He may be best known for the spoof movies that he co-wrote and produced with brothers Jerry Zucker and David Zucker, such as Airplane! (for which he was nominated for a BAFTA Award for Best Screenplay) and The Naked Gun series. The team of Zucker, Abrahams and Zucker (also referred to as "ZAZ") really began when the three men grew up together in Milwaukee, Wisconsin. He directed movies on his own, such as Big Business, and further honed his skills in parody with Hot Shots! and its 1993 sequel, Hot Shots! Part Deux. 

Abrahams and his wife, Nancy (née Cocuzzo) co-founded The Charlie Foundation To Help Cure Pediatric Epilepsy.

Filmography

Films

Executive producer only 
 Cry-Baby (1990)
 The Naked Gun : The Smell of Fear (1991)
 Naked Gun : The Final Insult (1994)

Acting roles

Television

Series

Other work

Acting roles

References

External links
 
 biodata,  The New York Times; accessed April 23, 2014.
 Charlie's Story; accessed November 25, 2014.

1944 births
Living people
American male screenwriters
American parodists
Filmmakers from Milwaukee
Jewish American screenwriters
Jewish American film directors
Writers Guild of America Award winners
People from Shorewood, Wisconsin
People from Eagle River, Wisconsin
Screenwriters from Wisconsin
Film producers from Wisconsin
Comedy film directors
Parody film directors
Shorewood High School (Wisconsin) alumni
21st-century American Jews